James B. Twitchell is an author and former professor of English.
He was born in 1943, in Burlington, Vermont.
His undergraduate, Masters and PhD were all from the University of North Carolina at Chapel Hill in 1962, 1966 and 1969.

Twitchell was a widely published, widely quoted tenured professor at the University of Florida
when in 2008 an investigative reporter at the Gainesville Sun found a pattern of plagiarizing passages from other writer's work.
The University decided to suspend Twitchell, with reinstatement conditional on Twitchell properly attributing each instance of plagiarism or close paraphrasing.
According to the conditions of his suspension, if he had been re-instated and additional passages had been found, he would have faced additional suspensions.
Twitchell, who was already in his sixties, chose not to appeal the ruling, and to resign his position.  Inside Higher Education quoted Grant McCracken, a blogger whose idea Twitchell had used, characterizing his comment as gracious: "As for Twitchell, it's sad. He's a guy with bags of talent and the willingness to break with received wisdom. I hope he keeps writing."

Works

References

External links 
Sut Jhally v. James Twitchell: [https://web.archive.org/web/20010306045842/http://stayfreemagazine.org/archives/16/twitchell.html What's wrong with advertising? (a debate)], Stay Free magazine #16, Summer 1999

1943 births
Living people
Writers from Burlington, Vermont
University of Florida faculty
University of North Carolina at Chapel Hill faculty
Loomis Chaffee School alumni